Dhoolsiras or Dhulsiras is located in Dwarka Sector 24, Delhi Sub-City in South-West Delhi. Dhool Siras is an urbanised village as per Delhi government's notification u/s 507.Originally it is a Jaat village of Godara Dabas Tokas Gotra.  It is bounded by Dwarka Sector 25 in the East, Najafgarh Drain in the west, Dwarka sector 19 in the North and Dwarka sector 28 in South.

The settlement of Dhool Siras dates back to around 1100 AD, after it has separated from village Bharthal. It is one of the most peaceful villages in Delhi with high literacy rate and very low crime rate with about 2250 registered voters.
The main source of income for the people of Dhool Siras is agriculture and rent from warehouses of retail stores.

The Delhi Development Authority has various plans around the village including a golf course on the northern side of the village. A new diplomatic enclave is also planned near the village with a greater number of embassies than Chanakyapuri. The recently announced India International Convention & Expo Center for hosting exhibitions, trade fairs, and national and international summits, planned on an area of 221.37 acres, in Sector 25 will commence near the village in the near future. Phase I of the IICC will be completed by December 2019. The Airport Express (Orange Line) of Delhi Metro will extend its services to the IICC, also to benefit the village in the near future.

Apart from Metro Station (Sector 21, 4 km from Dhool Siras), International Airport (15 minutes via road or 10 minutes via road and Airport Express Metro), an inter-state bus terminal is also planned in Sector 26, Dwarka (approx. 3 km). The Dwarka Expressway will also directly benefit the residents of Dhool Siras, which will connect Dwarka Sub-City to Gurugram.

References

Cities and towns in South West Delhi district